American Eagle bullion coins are produced by the United States Mint.

These include:
 American Silver Eagle
 American Gold Eagle
 American Platinum Eagle
 American Palladium Eagle

References

Bullion coins of the United States